I Love You is the first album by Japanese singer Megumi Nakajima. It was conceived as a "concept album" where each song is a "love letter" for each month of the year, starting with April for "Shining On" and moving through the rest of the months in chronological order. It contains new songs and some of her previous singles. The first press limited edition includes singles from several animations.

Track listing

References

2010 albums
Victor Entertainment albums